ITV Sunday Night Theatre, originally titled ITV Saturday Night Theatre and often shortened to simply Sunday Night Theatre or Saturday Night Theatre, is a British television anthology series screened on ITV, whose episodes were contributed by various companies in the ITV network.

The first episode of the programme was the teleplay Park People by Alun Owen which was directed by Peter Willes and starred Julian Glover, Elizabeth Shepherd, and Zena Walker. It aired on 11 January 1969.  
Around 200 episodes aired on ITV from 1969–1974, including productions of the plays Long Day's Journey into Night by Eugene O'Neill, A Doll's House by Henrik Ibsen, and Arms and the Man by George Bernard Shaw. Other episodes included adaptions of the works of William Shakespeare, James Joyce, Wilkie Collins, Simon Gray, Sam Shepard, Israel Horovitz, Arthur Miller, August Strindberg, J.B. Priestley, Lanford Wilson, and John Mortimer.

Among its directors were Michael Lindsay-Hogg, Anthony Page, Mike Newell, Fielder Cook, Ted Kotcheff, Peter Wood, and Vivian Matalon.

The actors involved included Helen Mirren, Laurence Olivier, Peggy Ashcroft, Sean Connery, Anthony Hopkins, Michael Caine, Paul Scofield, George C. Scott, Laurence Harvey, Ralph Richardson, Diana Rigg, Trevor Howard, Pamela Buchner, Glenda Jackson, Diane Cilento, Alec Guinness, Jane Asher, Martin Sheen, Colleen Dewhurst, Jean Marsh, Shelley Winters, Ian Holm, Richard Chamberlain, Edith Evans, John Gielgud, Shirley Knight, Gareth Forwood, Jeff Shankley, Sarah Douglas, Ian McKellen, George Sanders and Margaret Whiting.

Episodes
 Series 2, episode 44: "Twelfth Night" (ATV, 1970)  
 Series 4, episode 12: "Another Sunday and Sweet F.A." (Granada Television, 1972)
 Series  5, episode 13: "The Death of Adolf Hitler" (London Weekend, 1973)
 Series  5, episode 17: "The Ruffian on the Stair" (Yorkshire Television, 1973)
 Series  5, episode 20: "Long Day's Journey into Night" (ATV, 1973)
 Series  6, episode 9: "Catholics" (HTV, 1973)

References

External links

1969 British television series debuts
1974 British television series endings
1960s British anthology television series
1970s British anthology television series
Television series by ITV Studios
English-language television shows